Teatro Lira Paulistana was a theatre in São Paulo, Brazil.

References

Theatres in São Paulo